Brandon Darner is an American record producer, songwriter and musician. He has produced albums for a number of artists, including Imagine Dragons, To My Surprise, and his own alternative rock band, The Envy Corps among others. Darner is a founding member of the Envy Corps. Darner was also a touring percussionist for the heavy metal band Slipknot in 1998.

Production credits
Prismism – Keuning (2019)
Sparkle Sparkle – Holy White Hounds (2016, Razor & Tie)
Pop Sucker (EP) – John June Year (2014)
What's Fresh – Usonia (2012)
"It's Time" – Imagine Dragons (2012, Interscope) US number 15, UK number 23
"Amsterdam" – Imagine Dragons (2012, Interscope) UK number 143
"The River" – Imagine Dragons (2012, Interscope)
It Culls You – The Envy Corps (2011)
Kings & Queens of Air – Bright Giant (2011)
It's Time – Imagine Dragons (2011)
Bright Giant (EP) – Bright Giant (2009)
Kid Gloves – The Envy Corps (2009, Tempo Club)
Brain Cycles – Radio Moscow (2009, Alive)
Dwell – The Envy Corps (2008, Vertigo)
To My Surprise – To My Surprise (2003, Roadrunner)

References

Record producers from Iowa
Living people
Musicians from Des Moines, Iowa
Slipknot (band) members
Year of birth missing (living people)